The Samurai's Tale, by Erik Christian Haugaard, is a fiction novel published by Houghton Mifflin Company in 1984.

The novel is about a boy named Taro originally named Murakami. He loses his parents when he is young and is then captured by Takeda Shingen, eventually becoming a servant of one of his generals, Lord Akiyama. Eventually, Shingen dies, and his son - Takeda Katsuyori - takes over his father's realm. Meanwhile, Taro has become a samurai, received a new name, and has fought with a man named Lord Akiyama, who proves to be an able commander by taking over Iwamura castle from to Toyama's. He also falls in love with Aki-hime, the daughter of Lord Zakoji. Katsuyori proves to be incompetent, ignores advice from the retainers of his father, and shuns lord Akiyama, whose castle is eventually overrun by Oda Nobunaga. Katsuyori is defeated at Nagashino in 1575.

References

1984 American novels
American historical novels
Novels set in the 16th century
Novels set in Japan
Sengoku period in fiction
Japan in non-Japanese culture